The 1999–2000 Iraqi First Division was the 26th season of the competition since its foundation in 1974. The name of the league was changed from Iraqi Premier League to Iraqi First Division, and the season kicked off on 1 October 1999. The league title was won by Al-Zawraa for the second season in a row and the ninth time in their history.

They also won the Iraq FA Cup, the Iraqi Elite Cup and the Iraqi Super Cup in this season, completing only the second domestic quadruple in Iraqi football history after Al-Quwa Al-Jawiya achieved it in the 1996–97 season.

League table

Results

Season statistics

Top scorers

Hat-tricks

Notes
4 Player scored 4 goals
5 Player scored 5 goals

Awards
 Top scorer: Haidar Ayed (Al-Nasiriya)
 Best Player/MVP: Haidar Mahmoud (Al-Zawraa)
 Best Young Player: Ahsan Turki (Duhok)
 Best Goalkeeper: Hashim Khamis (Al-Quwa Al-Jawiya)
 Best Coach: Adnan Hamad (Al-Zawraa)

References

External links
 Iraq Football Association

Iraqi Premier League seasons
1999–2000 in Iraqi football
Iraq